Sagi Strauss (born 29 June 1976) is a retired Israeli association footballer. Strauss has been transferred or loaned to a new team before almost every season of his professional career.

Early and personal life
Strauss was born in moshav Yokneam Moshava, Israel, to a family of Ashkenazi Jewish descent. His brother Ram Strauss is an association footballer as well.

His sister Alvit Strauss married Argentine association footballer Roberto Colautti in 2005, and on account of their marriage Colautti became an Israeli citizen in 2007 and played for the Israel national football team, as well as four daughters together.

Honours
State Cup (1):
2003–04

References

External links

1976 births
Living people
Israeli Ashkenazi Jews
Israeli footballers
Maccabi Haifa F.C. players
Hapoel Acre F.C. players
Hapoel Rishon LeZion F.C. players
Hapoel Beit She'an F.C. players
Hapoel Kfar Saba F.C. players
Beitar Jerusalem F.C. players
Maccabi Ironi Kiryat Ata F.C. players
Maccabi Petah Tikva F.C. players
Bnei Sakhnin F.C. players
Hapoel Haifa F.C. players
Maccabi Ahi Nazareth F.C. players
Hapoel Ironi Kiryat Shmona F.C. players
Ahva Arraba F.C. players
Israel international footballers
Israeli Premier League players
Israeli people of German-Jewish descent
Association football goalkeepers
Jewish footballers